Aliens vs. Predator: Requiem – Original Motion Picture Soundtrack is the official soundtrack album of the 2007 science fiction film Aliens vs. Predator: Requiem. It was composed and conducted by Brian Tyler and released on December 11, 2007, by Varèse Sarabande and Fox Music. The score is completely orchestral and incorporates several themes from both the Alien and Predator franchises.

Background
The film's main theme track is a clash of two main themes, one consisting of the Predator type theme (bongos and basses) and the second of the Aliens (high pitched violins, violas and flutes). The directors Greg and Colin Strause wanted to take a new direction from Harald Kloser's Alien vs. Predator score and wanted Tyler to use some reference to the three films' original score pieces, such as the horrific violas and percussion from James Horner's Aliens and the primitive tribal percussion from Alan Silvestri's Predator and Predator 2. Tyler also referenced composers Elliot Goldenthal's Alien 3 and John Frizzell's Alien Resurrection into the score.

Track listing

Selected credits
Composed By [Music], Conductor [Music], Producer – Brian Tyler 
Edited By [Music Editor] – Joe Lisanti 
Executive Producer – Robert Townson 
Performer – The Hollywood Studio Symphony
Recorded By [Digital Recording By] – Bob Wolfe  
℗ © 2007 Twentieth Century Fox Film Corporation

References

2007 soundtrack albums
Brian Tyler soundtracks
Varèse Sarabande soundtracks
Alien (franchise) soundtracks
Predator (franchise)
Alien vs. Predator (franchise) mass media
Science fiction film soundtracks
Action film soundtracks